Salitje is a populated place in the south of Eswatini, by the border with South Africa, about 25 kilometres south of Hluthi.

Sources
Tracks4Africa.c.za: Salitje border post

Populated places in Eswatini
Eswatini–South Africa border crossings